In Greek mythology, Aethusa (Ancient Greek: Αἵθουσα) was a daughter of Poseidon and the Pleiad Alcyone, daughter of Atlas. She was loved by Apollo and bore to him Eleuther and Linus. Through either of the latter two, Aethusa became the grandmother of Pierus, father of Oeagrus, father of the musician Orpheus. Because of this genealogical fact, she was usually identified as a Thracian.

The word aethusa was used as an epithet for a portico that was open to the sun, that is, Apollo.

According to Pliny's Naturalis Historia, Aethusa is also the eponym of the Italian island which is now called Linosa.

Notes

References 

 Apollodorus, The Library with an English Translation by Sir James George Frazer, F.B.A., F.R.S. in 2 Volumes, Cambridge, MA, Harvard University Press; London, William Heinemann Ltd. 1921. . Online version at the Perseus Digital Library. Greek text available from the same website.
Bell, Robert E., Women of Classical Mythology: A Biographical Dictionary. ABC-Clio. 1991. .
Pausanias, Description of Greece with an English Translation by W.H.S. Jones, Litt.D., and H.A. Ormerod, M.A., in 4 Volumes. Cambridge, MA, Harvard University Press; London, William Heinemann Ltd. 1918. . Online version at the Perseus Digital Library
Pausanias, Graeciae Descriptio. 3 vols. Leipzig, Teubner. 1903.  Greek text available at the Perseus Digital Library.
 Suida, Suda Encyclopedia translated by Ross Scaife, David Whitehead, William Hutton, Catharine Roth, Jennifer Benedict, Gregory Hays, Malcolm Heath Sean M. Redmond, Nicholas Fincher, Patrick Rourke, Elizabeth Vandiver, Raphael Finkel, Frederick Williams, Carl Widstrand, Robert Dyer, Joseph L. Rife, Oliver Phillips and many others. Online version at the Topos Text Project.

Children of Poseidon
Women of Apollo

Princesses in Greek mythology
Columns and entablature